Hodonín ( is a name of several locations in the Czech Republic:

Hodonín, a town in the South Moravian Region
Hodonín District, a district around the town
Hodonín (Blansko District), a municipality and village in the South Moravian Region
Hodonín (Chrudim District), a municipality and village in the Pardubice Region